Naigaon is a railway station on the Western Line of the Mumbai Suburban Railway Network.  

Neighbourhood station to Naigaon in the south is Bhayandar. Platforms 2 & 4 operate Trains towards Churchgate side whereas Platforms 1 & 3 operate Trains towards Virar side.

External links
 Naigaon locality

Railway stations in Palghar district
Mumbai Suburban Railway stations
Mumbai WR railway division
Transport in Vasai-Virar